Urupuyu is a genus of spiders in the family Salticidae. It was first described in 2015 by Ruiz & Maddison. , it contains 3 species, all from Ecuador.

References

Salticidae
Salticidae genera
Spiders of South America